Peter Dean may refer to:

 Peter Dean (actor) (born 1939), British actor, most notable for his role in the BBC soap opera EastEnders
 Peter Dean (footballer) (born 1965), former Australian rules footballer
 Peter Dean (sailor) (born 1951), American former sailor and Olympic silver medalist
 Peter J. Dean, founder and president of Leaders By Design
 Peter Dean, American actor who hosted several episodes of Forensic Files